The 2012–13 Tennessee State Tigers basketball team represented Tennessee State University during the 2012–13 NCAA Division I men's basketball season. The Tigers, led by first year head coach and former assistant Travis Williams, played their home games at the Gentry Complex and were members of the East Division of the Ohio Valley Conference. They finished the season 18–15, 11–5 in OVC play to finish in third place in the East Division. They advanced to the semifinals of the OVC tournament where they lost to Belmont. They were invited to the 2013 CIT, their second consecutive CIT appearance, where they lost in the first round to Evansville.

Roster

Schedule

|-
!colspan=9| Exhibition

|-
!colspan=9| Regular season

|-
!colspan=9| 2013 OVC Basketball tournament

|-
!colspan=9| 2013 CIT

References

Tennessee State Tigers basketball seasons
Tennessee State
Tennessee State